Rannveig Djønne (born March 3, 1974) is a Norwegian folk musician from Djønno in the municipality of Ullensvang, Norway. Djønne plays diatonic button accordion and is a graduate of the Ole Bull Academy in Voss. 

She released her first CD in December 2008. The CD is called Spelferd heim – slåtter frå Hardanger og Voss på durspel (Spelferd Heim: Tunes from Hardanger and Voss for Button Accordion). Other performers with her on the CD are Inger Elisabeth Aarvik, Arngunn Timenes Bell, Anders Hall, Kim André Rysstad, Lajla Renate Buer Storli, and Tuva Syvertsen. They perform music based on melodies by Nils Tjoflot and others, as well as music that Djønne wrote herself.

Works
 2008: (with various artists) Spelferd heim – slåttar frå Hardanger og Voss på durspel, Djønno Records
 2012: (with Annlaug Børsheim) Toras Dans – Populærmusikk Frå Hardanger, Fivreld

References

External links
 MySpace page on Rannveig Djønne

1974 births
Norwegian folk musicians
People from Ullensvang
Living people
21st-century Norwegian accordionists
21st-century Norwegian women musicians
Women accordionists